Jason Patrick Willis (born July 26, 1980) is an American football wide receiver who is currently a free agent.

High school career
Willis attended Saint Bernard High School in Playa Del Rey, California. As a sophomore, Willis started at safety, earning Rookie of the Year honors.  His junior year, Willis ranked 2nd in the league in rushing, and 2nd in total individual tackles. As a senior, he was the Defensive Player of the Year, member of the "All Regional Team" as a running back, and SuperPrep All-American candidate. He also was a 3x Del Rey League, 1st team selection. Willis ran track, including top honors in the 200 m, 400 m, 4 × 100 m relay, and 4 × 400 m relay.

College career
Willis played collegiately at the University of Oregon. He started his junior and senior year, playing in 47 games, totaling 93 catches for 1,117 yards with three touchdowns. As a red-shirt freshman, Willis contributed heavily on special teams, but still served as a viable back up receiver. As a sophomore, Willis solidified himself as the 3rd receiver behind starters Marshaun Tucker and Keenan Howry. Averaging 4 catches a game, Willis ended his sophomore campaign, scoring his first touchdown in the 2000 Culligan Holiday Bowl in San, Diego, California. That touchdown resulted in the game winning score. Willis enjoyed a stellar junior year.  Earning the starting spot, with teammates Keenan Howry and Sammie Parker, the three were considered one of the most "lethal" receiving core tandems in college football. His junior year ended with the controversial BCS decision to pick Nebraska over Oregon, for the National Championship match up.  Nebraska went on to lose to Miami. Oregon defeated the Big 12 Champion Colorado Buffaloes 38 - 16.   Willis was known for his sure hands, blocking ability, and deceptive 4.3 speed. He also, served as a running back in special designed game plans.  In 2002, Willis and teammates Keenan Howry, Sammie Parker, were displayed on a 10-story billboard in downtown Los Angeles California.  The billboard was used as a vital recruiting tool in Los Angeles. The billboard sat adjacent to the Staple Center.  All three receivers attended Los Angeles based high schools.  Willis also ran track for the University of Oregon with a personal best of 21.15 (200 m). He was the lead-off leg for the 4 × 100 m relay team.

Professional career
Willis signed with the Seattle Seahawks active roster as an undrafted free agent his rookie year 2003 but was placed on injured reserve after breaking his thumb in the opening game of that year. He was allocated to NFL Europe to play with the Frankfurt Galaxy, where he led the team in receptions and yards and paced first place in the league with an average of 30 yards per kickoff return. Willis also led his team to the 2004 World Bowl Championship, where they were defeated by the Berlin Thunder.

During his second season with the Seahawks 2004, Willis played alongside hall of famer  Jerry Rice. Willis was released during his third year with Seattle and was signed by the Miami Dolphins, where he played with former NFL receivers Wes Welker and Marty Booker. Willis also rejoined college teammate Joey Harrington in Miami. After a two-year stint with the Dolphins, Willis was signed with the Washington Redskins.

Willis played his first arena season in 2008 for the New York Dragons where he set the single-season reception record of (140). He also played alongside Aaron Garcia, who is arguably the best quarterback to play arena football. Willis continued his arena career in 2010 with the Jacksonville Sharks where he helped lead the team to its first playoff berth in their inaugural year. Willis was later signed by the Pittsburgh Power the following year where he led the team in yards and receptions.

In 2012, Willis assigned to the San Antonio Talons and led the team in receptions, helping the team win 12 consecutive games and a first-round playoff berth in its inaugural season. Willis was later assigned to the San Jose SaberCats in November 2012.

His 2013 campaign with the San Jose SaberCats was a record setting year as Willis topped the single season yardage record of 1,560 set by teammate and hall of famer James Roe back in 2007.  His own personal best of 1,606 yards and 35 touchdowns in both categories helped the SaberCats reach the playoffs before losing to the would-be ArenaBowl Champion Arizona Rattlers.

Willis returned to San Jose in 2014 and climbed one step closer to achieving a championship career but fell one game short losing in the semi finals once again to the Arizona Rattlers who would go on to win the ArenaBowl. His sixth consecutive season of 1,000 yards and 20 plus touchdowns were just one of the many consistent traits Willis possessed that made him an elite wide receiver in that league.

On April 30, 2015, Willis was assigned to the Las Vegas Outlaws.

References

1980 births
Living people
American football wide receivers
Players of American football from Los Angeles
Oregon Ducks football players
Seattle Seahawks players
Frankfurt Galaxy players
Miami Dolphins players
Washington Redskins players
New York Dragons players
Jacksonville Sharks players
Pittsburgh Power players
San Antonio Talons players
San Jose SaberCats players
Las Vegas Outlaws (arena football) players